Robert Pateman (28 August 1856, date of death unknown) was an Australian cricketer. He played two first-class cricket matches for Victoria between 1880 and 1882.

See also
 List of Victoria first-class cricketers

References

External links
 

1856 births
Year of death missing
Australian cricketers
Victoria cricketers